The 1931 Cork Intermediate Hurling Championship was the 22nd staging of the Cork Intermediate Hurling Championship since its establishment by the Cork County Board in 1909.

Ballyhea won the championship following a 7-4 to 1-1 defeat of Bandon in the final. This was their first championship title in the grade.

Results

Final

References

Cork Intermediate Hurling Championship
Cork Intermediate Hurling Championship